Emamzadeh Seyyed Hoseyn Kornag (also Romanized as Emāmzādeh Seyyed Ḩoseyn Kornag) is a village in Sarduiyeh Rural District, Sarduiyeh District, Jiroft County, Kerman Province, Iran. At the 2006 census, its population was 32, in 6 families.

References 

Populated places in Jiroft County